Richard Stricker (born 3 November 1970) is a Dutch football defender and later manager.

References

1970 births
Living people
Dutch footballers
FC Den Bosch players
SC Telstar players
Eredivisie players
Eerste Divisie players
Association football defenders
Dutch football managers
FC Volendam non-playing staff
Royal Antwerp F.C. managers
Sparta Rotterdam non-playing staff
Dutch expatriate football managers
Expatriate football managers in Belgium
Dutch expatriate sportspeople in Belgium